Lights Out (Portuguese: Luz Apagada) is a 1953 Brazilian drama film directed by Carlos Thiré and starring Mário Sergio, Maria Fernanda and Fernando Pereira.

Cast
 Mário Sergio 
 Maria Fernanda as Glória  
 Fernando Pereira 
 Xandó Batista 
 Erminio Spalla 
 Sérgio Hingst 
 Helena Barreto Leite 
 Nelson Camargo 
 Victor Merinow 
 Luciano Pessoa 
 Antônio Coelho 
 David Novach 
 Araújo Salles 
 Lourenço Ferreira
 Sérgio Britto
 Léa Camargo 
 Abigail Costa 
 Ray Endsleigh 
 Luiz Francunha 
 Gilza Gabindo 
 Leo Godoy 
 Jorge Goulart 
 Robert Huke 
 Luiz Linhares (voice)  
 Raul Luciano 
 Pierino Massenzi 
 Paulo Monte 
 Geraldo Santos Pereira 
 Olívia Pineschi 
 João Ribas 
 Renato Pacheco e Silva 
 Carlos Thiré 
 Sergio Warnovsky

References

Bibliography
 Cláudio da Costa. Cinema brasileiro, anos 60-70: dissimetria, oscilação e simulacro. 7Letras, 2000.

External links

1953 drama films
1953 films
Brazilian drama films
1950s Portuguese-language films
Brazilian black-and-white films